Briord is a commune in the Ain department in eastern France.

Population

Economy
Ligne Roset has its headquarters and a furniture factory in Briord.

See also
Communes of the Ain department

References

Communes of Ain
Ain communes articles needing translation from French Wikipedia